Eric Peter Karros (born November 4, 1967) is an American former professional baseball first baseman. Karros played in Major League Baseball (MLB) from 1991 to 2004 for the Los Angeles Dodgers, Chicago Cubs, and Oakland Athletics. He was the National League Rookie of the Year in 1992 and won a Silver Slugger Award in 1995. Karros currently works as a sportscaster, covering the Dodgers on Spectrum SportsNet LA.

Early life
Karros was born in Hackensack, New Jersey, and graduated from Patrick Henry High School in San Diego, California. He attended UCLA, where he played on the Bruins baseball team and, in 1993, earned a degree in economics.

Playing career

Los Angeles Dodgers
Karros was selected by the Los Angeles Dodgers in the sixth round of the 1988 Major League Baseball draft. He made his Major League debut as a pinch runner on September 1, 1991, against the Chicago Cubs. He made his first start, at first base, on September 4, 1991, against the St. Louis Cardinals, when he was 0-for-3 with two strikeouts. Karros recorded his first Major League hit as a pinch hitter in the bottom of the 12th inning against Cincinnati Reds pitcher Milt Hill on September 16, 1991. It was a two-run RBI double to left field, his only hit in 14 batting appearances during the 1991 season.

In his first at-bat of the 1992 season, on April 9 against the San Diego Padres, Karros hit a two-run shot to deep left field off of Craig Lefferts for his first career home run. He became a full-time starter for the Dodgers that season, appearing in 149 games and hitting 20 home runs while driving in 88 runs. He was named the 1992 National League Rookie of the Year. Karros put up consistent numbers throughout his career with the Dodgers, with a batting average just under .270 and an average of almost 25 home runs a year. He became the third Dodgers player in history to record 30 home runs and 100 RBI in five different seasons (alongside Duke Snider and Gil Hodges). Karros also remains the only player in Dodgers history to hit two homers in the same inning, accomplishing the feat on August 22, 2000.  was his best statistical year with the Dodgers, when he hit .304 with 34 home runs and 112 RBI. His career 270 home runs as a Los Angeles Dodger are the most since the team moved to Los Angeles, and third in all-time Dodgers history.

Chicago Cubs
On December 2, 2002, he was traded along with Mark Grudzielanek to the Chicago Cubs in exchange for Todd Hundley and Chad Hermansen. Karros started the season as the Cubs' backup first baseman but took over the role at the beginning of June after Hee-seop Choi was injured in a collision with Cubs teammate Kerry Wood. After playing the  season with the Cubs he was granted free agency from the team at the end of the year. In 114 games with the Cubs, he hit .286 with 12 home runs and 40 RBI.

Oakland Athletics
He then signed with the Oakland Athletics before the start of the  season. Karros’ final MLB game was on July 21, 2004, and he was released by the Athletics on August 3, 2004. He only appeared in 40 games with the team, hitting .194 with two home runs and 11 RBI.

Career statistics

In 15 postseason games, in the 1995, 1996 and 2003 National League Division Series and 2003 National League Championship Series Karros batted .300 (15-for-50) with nine runs, four home runs and six RBI.

Highlights
1992 National League Rookie of the Year
1995 National League Silver Slugger Award at First Base
Finished 5th in voting for 1995 National League MVP
Los Angeles Dodgers Career Sacrifice Flies Leader (74)
Second-most career home runs for a Player Born in New Jersey (284)
Second-most career home runs (behind Tim Salmon) for any player in MLB history who never appeared in the All-Star Game

Broadcasting career
Karros works as a color commentator for baseball on Fox. He previously worked for Fox Sports in 2004 doing the pregame shows for the Major League Baseball playoffs, and ESPN until 2006 as a studio and game analyst. He previously worked on KCAL-TV in Los Angeles, where he did the pre-game show for Dodger games. Karros was a co-broadcaster in the MLB: The Show titles, debuting on MLB 11: The Show, commentating with Matt Vasgersian, Dave Campbell and Steve Lyons.

Karros was hired to call regional games for Fox Saturday Baseball in 2007. He was promoted to the secondary team in 2011, primarily calling games with Thom Brennaman. In March 2014, it was announced that Brennaman and Karros would continue to call FOX games together, and the pair called the first regular season game ever on Fox Sports 1.

In March 2022, Karros returned to his Dodger broadcasting post as he joined the Spectrum SportsNet LA network.

Personal life
Karros and his wife Trish have three children. Their sons Kyle and Jared both played college baseball at UCLA. Jared was selected by the Dodgers in the 2022 MLB Draft.

See also
List of Major League Baseball career home run leaders
List of Major League Baseball career runs batted in leaders

References

External links
 

Baseball Almanac
Retrosheet
The Baseball Gauge
Venezuela Winter League

1967 births
Living people
Albuquerque Dukes players
Bakersfield Dodgers players
Baseball players from New Jersey
Chicago Cubs players
Major League Baseball broadcasters
Great Falls Dodgers players
Leones del Caracas players
American expatriate baseball players in Venezuela
Los Angeles Dodgers announcers
Los Angeles Dodgers Legend Bureau
Los Angeles Dodgers players
Major League Baseball first basemen
Major League Baseball Rookie of the Year Award winners
Oakland Athletics players
Sportspeople from Hackensack, New Jersey
San Antonio Missions players
San Bernardino Stampede players
UCLA Bruins baseball players
University of California, Los Angeles alumni
Silver Slugger Award winners